MFC 28: Supremacy was a mixed martial arts event held by the Maximum Fighting Championship (MFC) on February 25, 2011 at the River Cree Casino in Enoch, Alberta.

Background
Antonio McKee was originally scheduled to defend his lightweight title against Drew Fickett. However, McKee was forced to withdraw from the bout and was replaced by UFC veteran Matt Veach.

Results

Main Card
MFC Light Heavyweight Championship bout:  Ryan Jimmo vs.  Dwayne Lewis
Jimmo defeated Lewis via TKO (doctor stoppage) at 3:13 of round 3 to win the vacant MFC Light Heavyweight Championship.
Catchweight (160 lbs) bout:  Drew Fickett vs.  Matt Veach
Fickett defeated Veach via submission (armbar) at 0:36 of round 1.
Lightweight bout:  Richie Whitson vs.  Curtis Demarce
Whitson defeated Demarce via split decision (28–29, 29–28, 29–28).
Welterweight bout:  Thomas Denny vs.  Sheldon Westcott
Denny and Westcott fought to a split draw (28–28, 28–27, 28–29).
Light Heavyweight bout:  Rodney Wallace vs.  Emanuel Newton
Newton defeated Wallace via submission (rear naked choke) at 4:34 of round 2.
Lightweight bout:  Robert Washington vs.  Tyrone Glover
Glover defeated Washington via split decision (29–28, 28–29, 29–28).
Lightweight bout:  Dan Ring vs.  Garret Nybakken
Ring defeated Nybakken via submission (rear naked choke) at 2:21 of round 2.Catchweight (179 lb.) bout:  Brendan Kornberger vs.  Paapa Inkumsah
Kornberger defeated Inkumsah via unanimous decision.

References

28
2011 in mixed martial arts
Mixed martial arts in Canada
Sport in Alberta
2011 in Canadian sports